L.G.R srl is an Italian eyewear manufacturer of high-end glasses and sunglasses, started by Luca Gnecchi Ruscone in 2007.

History

Luca Gnecchi Ruscone, whose initials inspired the brand's name, established the company after having made a trip to Eritrea, Africa in 2006. There he visited an optical store in Asmara, owned by his grandfather, he then discovered a box of sunglasses which had been imported from Italy over 50 years ago.

Upon returning to Italy from Eritrea with the sunglasses, Luca began to receive many requests for the frames. He then decided to start a business, where he was able to re-open the original factory which had closed in 1968 due to the arrival of new technologies and industrial methods. He began a small production of four of the authentic frames that would respect the same artisan methods of their original make. From then on the line has developed into a selection of sunglasses and optical frames, which are all inspired by the original discovery made in Asmara.

Features

 The trademark of the brand is based on one of the first original models which is "Massawa", a classic Italian aviator dating back to the 1930s.
 Since the idea of the brand originated in Africa, every model is named after an African city.
 The exterior of the sunglasses are clear of any logo, which can only be seen from the interior.

Components

 L.G.R has every component of their product made in Italy.
 The hand carved cellulose acetate frames are hand polished in three different steps with flex hinges.
 The crystal lenses are anti-scratch and mineral tempered, which are impact resistant and have various treatments such as: polarization, anti-reflective coating, infrared protection, color enhancement treatment, UV protection, and photochromization (please see photochromic lens).

Press

 The company has been featured in several fashion magazines in 2010 such as: Vogue (magazine), Harper's Bazaar, Elle (magazine), GQ, The Guardian, The Telegraph, La Repubblica, and GQ.com, and many more established journals.

References

External links 
 L.G.R Sunglasses Official Website
 Antonio Marras
 Corviglia Ski Club
 L.G.R Blog
 Facebook page
 Silmo

Eyewear brands of Italy
Sunglasses
Eyewear companies of Italy